Hinduism is practised by 1.7% of the population of Myanmar. Hinduism is practised by about 890,000 people in Myanmar, and has been influenced by elements of Buddhism, with many Hindu temples in Myanmar housing statues of the Buddha. There are also a large population of Hindus in which the Myanmar Tamils and minority Bengali Hindus having the biggest population share.

History
Hinduism, along with Buddhism, arrived in Burma during ancient times. Both names of the country are rooted in Hinduism; Burma is the British colonial officials' phonetic equivalent for the first half of Brahma Desha, the ancient name of the region. Brahma is part of Hindu trinity, a deity with four heads. The name Myanmar is the regional language transliteration of Brahma, where b and m are interchangeable.

Arakan (Rakhine) Yoma is a significant natural mountainous barrier between Burma and India, and the migration of Hinduism and Buddhism into Burma occurred slowly through Manipur and by South Asian seaborne traders. Hinduism greatly influenced the royal court of Burmese kings in pre-colonial times, as seen in the architecture of cities such as Bagan. Likewise, the Burmese language adopted many words from Sanskrit and Pali, many of which relate to religion.

While ancient and medieval arrival of ideas and culture fusion transformed Burma over time, it is in 19th and 20th century that over a million Hindu workers were brought in by British colonial government to serve in plantations and mines. The British also felt that surrounding the European residential centre with Indian immigrants provided a buffer and a degree of security from tribal theft and raids. According to 1931 census, 55% of Rangoon's (Yangon) population were Indian migrants, mostly Hindus.

After independence from Britain, ten years was under the Democratic government led by various leaders and fought for the stronghold of the power. While the country was still suffering from post-war economic downfall and constant attacks from insurgent groups supported by external influences, the power struggle between the two leading parties reached its peak. It resulted in the Prime Minister U Nu handing over the power to General Ne Win as the leader of the caretaker government in 1960. The situation was not improved as more resistance from the different parties and demands, General Ne Win formed the Resistance Council and lead the country since 1962. Later it changed the name of the party to Burma Socialist Programme Party. The government allowed all nationalities to register to become citizens since 1948 under The Union of citizenship Act 1948 and those who wanted to remain as foreigners are required to register under the Registration of foreigners rules 1948. Many of those who applied to become a naturalized citizen or registered as foreigners according to the acts but many were ignored to those requirements to remain in the country. When General Ne Win came into power he strongly implemented those acts. As a result about 300,000 Indian ethnic people along with 100,000 Chinese left Burma between 1963 and 1967. There was no such thing against Indian ethnicity based on any political interest as claimed by some, but the policies were in place since before independence, and it was implemented when needed. The claim made against Burmese government support of left-leaning rebel groups in the northeastern state of India was also questionable as the left-leaning rebel groups were established before their independence and heavily supported by others Timeline of the Naxalite–Maoist insurgency in India.

Demography

The Burmese census data only reports individuals who stated Hinduism. Pew Research estimated a range of 820,000 to 840,000 Hindus in 2010.

Population by State/Region
Population of Hindus by State/Region, according to the 2014 census.

Ethnicity

Predominantly, Burmese Indians make up Myanmar's population of Hindus. The practice of Hinduism among Burmese Indians is also influenced by Buddhism. In addition to Hindu deities, the Buddha is also worshiped and many Hindu temples in Myanmar house statues of the Buddha. The Burmese Indians include Myanmar Tamils, Bengalis, Odias etc.

The majority of the Meitei (or Manipuri) in Myanmar practice Hinduism. They are descendants of forced labourers taken from Manipur during the Manipuri–Burmese war from 1819 to 1825. Manipuris are concentrated in about 13 villages in the Mandalay, Sagaing and Amarapura areas. Manipuri settlements are also found along the Ningthi river, and the areas sandwiched between the river and the boundary of Manipur.

Many Nepali-speaking Burmese Gurkha in Myanmar also practice Hinduism. Burmese Gurkha came along with British Army during colonial period. There are approximately 250 Hindu Temples build by Burmese Gurkha in and across country which of 30 temples are in Mandalay Region of Mogok City alone. Apparent there are three to five temples which are over 100 years old. 
A small minority of  Bengali Hindus also practice Hinduism.

Ethnic data was last collected in Myanmar for the 1983 Census, and the census department didn't published stats related to ethnicity after that. Back in 1983, there were 428,428 Indians, 42,140 Pakistanis, 567,985 Rohingya and 28,506 Nepalis. Due to the mutual overlap in religious traditions, it is possible that some of the Hindus among these ethnicities reported as Buddhist during the 1983 Census. This may explain the low number of Hindus reported in 1983 (177,215).

As per the 1983 Census report, among the ethnic Indians 27.10% reported themselves as Buddhist, 33.64% as Hindu, 32.71% as Muslim, 4.44% as Christian and 2.10% as Others. Among the ethnic Burmese, the census reported three thousand Hindus. Out of the 174,401 Hindus reported in 1983, the ethnicity was as follows: Indian - 143,545, Chinese - 43, Mixed race - 4,882, Pakistani - 567, Bangladeshi - 865, Nepalese - 17,410, Other foreigners - 679, Kachin -48, Kayah - 3, Karen - 55, Chin - 155, Burmese - 2,988, Mon - 27, Rakhine - 99, Shan - 69 and other indigenous - 2,966.

Contemporary status

Aspects of Hinduism continue in Burma today, even in the majority Buddhist culture. For example, Thagyamin is worshipped whose origins are in the Hindu god Indra. Burmese literature has also been enriched by Hinduism, including the Burmese adaptation of the Ramayana, called Yama Zatdaw. Many Hindu gods are likewise worshipped by many Burmese people, such as Saraswati (known as Thuyathadi in Burmese), the goddess of knowledge, who is often worshipped before examinations; Shiva is called Paramizwa; Vishnu is called Withano, and others. Many of these ideas are part of thirty seven Nat or deities found in Burmese culture.

In modern Myanmar, most Hindus are found in the urban centres of Yangon and Mandalay. Ancient Hindu temples are present in other parts of Burma, such as the 11th century Nathlaung Kyaung Temple dedicated to Vishnu in Bagan.

ISKCON (Hare Krishna) has a presence in Myanmar. The largest Hare Krishna community is in Myitkyina which has about 400 followers.

Public holidays
Deepavali is a public holiday in Myanmar.

Persecution of Hindus

After independence from Britain, Burma Socialist Programme Party under Ne Win adopted xenophobic policies and expelled 300,000 Indian ethnic people (many of whom were Hindus and included Sikhs, Buddhists, and Muslims), along with 100,000 Chinese, from Burma between 1963 and 1967.

On 25 August 2017, the villages in a cluster known as Kha Maung Seik in northern Maungdaw District of Rakhine State in Myanmar were attacked by Rohingya Muslims of Arakan Rohingya Salvation Army (ARSA).This was called Kha Maung Seik massacre. Amnesty International said that about 99 Hindus were killed in that day.
These Rohingya Hindus  identify themselves as Chittagonian due to fear from Anti-Rohingya sentiment formed by Rohingya terrorists.

Hindu organisations and temples
Myanmar Hindu Central Council and Sanatan Dharma Swayamsevak Sangh are the two largest Hindu organizations in Myanmar.

All Myanmar Gurkha Hindu Religious Association is another Hindu organisation representing Gurkha Hindus. ISKCON has 12 centres in Myanmar and a school in Zayyawadi which provides religious education to brahmacharis

Temples
Nathlaung Kyaung Temple
Shri Kali Temple, Burma
Sri Varatha Raja Perumal Temple
Shree Maha Lakshmi Temple
Sri Kali Amman Temple
Kartayri Temple
Sri Radha Mandalayshwar Temple
Shree Ram Temple
Sri Ganesh Temple

See also

Hinduism in Bangladesh
Hinduism in India
Hinduism in West Bengal
Hinduism in Vietnam
Religion in Myanmar
Burmese Indians
Bengali Hindus in Myanmar

References

Citations

Bibliography

External links 

 

 
Religion in Myanmar
Hinduism in Southeast Asia
Hinduism in Asia